The Whiterocks River is a river in Uintah and Duchesne counties in Utah, United States.

See also

 List of rivers of Utah
 List of tributaries of the Colorado River

References

External links

Rivers of Utah
Rivers of Uintah County, Utah
Tributaries of the Colorado River in Utah
Tributaries of the Green River (Colorado River tributary)